Crookston can refer to:

Crookston, Glasgow, Scotland
Crookston Castle
Crookston, Minnesota, United States
University of Minnesota Crookston
Crookston, Nebraska, United States
Crookston, Ontario, Canada; a community
Crookston, New Zealand